Mieczysław Munz (October 31, 1900, Kraków – August 25, 1976) was a Polish-American pianist.

Munz trained in Vienna and Berlin, with Ferruccio Busoni. He was a teacher of Emanuel Ax, Walter Hautzig, David Oei, Ann Schein, Virginia Reinecke, Adolovni Acosta, and Iravati M. Sudiarso.

He left concertizing in the early 1940s after developing physical problems with his right hand.

His ex-wife was Aniela (Nela) Młynarska (daughter of Emil Młynarski), who later married Arthur Rubinstein.

Recordings 

Americus Records, Inc. has issued a compact disc purporting to contain all extant recordings of Munz: The Art of Mieczyslaw Munz, AMR20021022.  It includes Mozart's Piano Concerto In D Minor, K.466; Rachmaninoff's Rhapsody on a Theme of Paganini; and various short works, several being virtuoso transcriptions.

References

External links 
 

Polish classical pianists
American classical pianists
Male classical pianists
American male pianists
Polish emigrants to the United States
1900 births
1976 deaths
20th-century classical pianists
20th-century American pianists
20th-century American male musicians